Pleasant Hill is a city in Contra Costa County, California, United States, in the East Bay of the San Francisco Bay Area. The population was 34,613 at the 2020 census. It was incorporated in 1961. Pleasant Hill is the home of College Park High School, Diablo Valley College, the Pleasant Hill Library of the Contra Costa County Library system, and the Pleasant Hill Recreation & Park District.

History and architecture 

Before colonization the area was inhabited by members of the Bay Miwok people. The San Ramon Valley Branch Line of the Southern Pacific entered service in 1891 with two flag stops in the area that would become the City of Pleasant Hill: Hookston, located today where the Iron Horse Regional Trail crosses Hookston Road, and Sparkle, where the Southern Pacific and Sacramento Northern Railway intersected and today stands the Pleasant Hill BART station. The area began to be suburbanized in the 1920s following prohibition, as the many local vineyards were removed and the formerly agricultural land was subdivided for housing. Monument Boulevard was named after the Soldiers Memorial Monument to commemorate veterans and war dead of World War I from Contra Costa County. It was erected on December 11, 1927 at the intersection of Monument Boulevard and the Contra Costa Highway, now Contra Costa Boulevard. The monument depicts one black and three white soldiers. In 1954 the monument was moved to its current site at the intersection of Boyd Road and Contra Costa Boulevard to make way for the construction of State Route 21.

Developed largely in the years following World War II, the area did not have a post office until 1948. The city incorporated in 1961.

On February 21, 1967, Century 21 Theaters opened an 895-seat dome theater between Monument Boulevard and Hookston Road (I-680 was later constructed passing west of here). Visible from the freeway after it was constructed, the futuristic dome-topped cinema became an iconic landmark for the newly incorporated city. The theater was designed by prolific Bay Area architect Vincent G. Raney. It had a distinctive 50-foot-high domed ceiling and oversized curved screen. The theater was initially built to showcase the Cinerama widescreen process developed in the 1950s. The screen was later updated to standard flat-screen. In 1973, four additional single-screen auditoriums were added to the front of the building. Renamed as Century 5 Theatres, it continued to be known familiarly as the Dome.

The city hall of Pleasant Hill was designed by architect Charles Moore. Completed in the late 20th century, it has won several awards for architectural design.

For most of its history, Pleasant Hill did not have a true downtown or Main Street. In 1991, the city began planning the redevelopment of the area around the intersection of Monument and Contra Costa boulevards. In July 2000, Downtown Pleasant Hill finally opened. The privately owned and operated outdoor shopping center was designed to resemble a typical small Main Street.

Starting in 2003, CinéArts operated the former Century 5 Theatres, screening primarily independent and foreign films. Due to changes in viewing habits, as many people screened movies at home, business continued to decline. The theater's property owner, SyWest Development, closed the Dome on April 21, 2013. On its last night of operation, CinéArts screened Stanley Kubrick's classic 2001: A Space Odyssey.

Sywest gained the approval of the Pleasant Hill City Council for its proposal to tear down the theater and redevelop the property as a two-story, 73,000+ square-foot building to house a Dick's Sporting Goods. Supporters of the theater submitted two separate appeals to overturn the approval of demolition: one by a resident of Pleasant Hill, and one by Save the Pleasant Hill Dome (SPHD) organization. Both appeals were voted down by a majority of the city council; Mayor Michael G. Harris and councilmember Ken Carlson voted in favor of the appeal. SyWest had the Dome demolished on May 8, 2013, precluding any further court action.

On October 14, 2019, a magnitude 4.5 earthquake shook the town.

Geography and climate 

Pleasant Hill has a varied landscape with some valleys and rolling hills. In undisturbed wilderness, oak woodlands and mixed woods can be found. It is located in the central East San Francisco Bay.

This region has warm and dry summers, with no average monthly temperatures above . According to the Köppen Climate Classification system, Pleasant Hill has a warm-summer Mediterranean climate, abbreviated "Csb" on climate maps. Winter daytime temperatures tend to be in the fifties and sixties, and summers range in the high seventies to upper eighties, occasionally reaching the low nineties. On very rare occasions, the temperatures can reach the one hundred degree range during extreme heat waves. Freezing in winter is rare, but it does happen. Summer fog is occasional but winter fog is very common.

Economy

Top employers 

According to the city's 2013 Comprehensive Annual Financial Report (CAFR), as of 2009 the city's principal employers were:

Education

Primary and secondary schools

Public schools 

Elementary schools
 Fair Oaks Elementary School
 Gregory Gardens Elementary School
 Pleasant Hill Elementary School
 Sequoia Elementary School
 Strandwood Elementary School
 Valhalla Elementary School
Middle schools
 Pleasant Hill Middle School
 Sequoia Middle School
 Valley View Middle School
High schools
 College Park High School

Private schools
 Christ the King Catholic School
 Pleasant Hill Adventist Academy

Colleges and universities 

 Diablo Valley College
 John F. Kennedy University

Public libraries 

The Pleasant Hill Library of the Contra Costa County Library is located in Pleasant Hill. The library system was headquartered in Pleasant Hill before relocating to Martinez in preparation for the construction of a new Pleasant Hill Library.

Parks and recreation 

Parks in Pleasant Hill are maintained and managed by the Pleasant Hill Recreation & Park District. The district is a separate entity from the City of Pleasant Hill.

 Brookwood Park
 Chilpancingo Park
 Dinosaur Hill Park
 Las Juntas Open Space
 Paso Nogal Park
 Pinewood Park
 Pleasant Hill Aquatic Park
 Pleasant Hill Education Center Pool
 Pleasant Hill Park
 Pleasant Oaks Park
 Rodgers Ranch Heritage Center (See Patrick Rodgers Farm)
 Rodgers-Smith Park
 Shannon Hills Park
 Sherman Acres Park
 Shadowood Park
 Soldiers Memorial Park (Owned by Contra Costa County)

Demographics 

The 2010 United States Census reported that Pleasant Hill had a population of 33,152. The racial makeup of Pleasant Hill was 24,846 (74.9%) White, 686 (2.1%) African American, 127 (0.4%) Native American, 4,516 (13.6%) Asian, 66 (0.2%) Pacific Islander, 1,079 (3.3%) from other races, and 1,832 (5.5%) from two or more races. Hispanic or Latino of any race were 4,009 persons (12.1%).

The Census reported that 32,689 people (98.6 percent of the population) lived in households, 151 (0.5%) lived in non-institutionalized group quarters, and 312 (0.9%) were institutionalized.

There were 13,708 households, out of which 3,892 (28.4%) had children under the age of 18 living in them, 6,329 (46.2%) were opposite-sex married couples living together, 1,359 (9.9%) had a female householder with no husband present, 597 (4.4%) had a male householder with no wife present. There were 789 (5.8%) unmarried opposite-sex partnerships, and 152 (1.1%) same-sex married couples or partnerships. 3,929 households (28.7%) were made up of individuals, and 1,431 (10.4%) had someone living alone who was 65 years of age or older. The average household size was 2.38. There were 8,285 families (60.4 percent of all households); the average family size was 2.96.

The population was spread out, with 6,563 people (19.8%) under the age of 18, 3,180 people (9.6%) aged 18 to 24, 8,901 people (26.8%) aged 25 to 44, 9,902 people (29.9%) aged 45 to 64, and 4,606 people (13.9%) who were 65 years of age or older. The median age was 40.7 years. For every 100 females, there were 94.1 males. For every 100 females age 18 and over, there were 91.0 males.

The homeowner vacancy rate was 1.3 percent; the rental vacancy rate was 5.1 percent. 21,253 people (64.1 percent of the population) lived in owner-occupied housing units and 11,436 people (34.5%) lived in rental housing units.

Planning and environmental factors 
The Gregory Gardens subdivision developed in 1950 required purchasers of new homes to accept a Covenant that restricted ownership to Caucasians (such provisions have since been ruled as unconstitutional).  The Covenant also limited the structures that could be built, animals allowed on premises, and commercial activities.

Pleasant Hill used a system of environmental planning at a relatively early stage of its modern growth. Notably the city authorized a study in the 1980s of hillside development, which included detailed mapping of biota, geotechnical hazards, sound levels and other environmental constraints. These studies were used to establish appropriate zoning and development densities for all the principal undeveloped hillside areas within the city.

Media 
The city of Pleasant Hill is served by the East Bay Times daily newspaper, published by Bay Area News Group-East Bay (part of the Media News Group of Denver, Colorado). It is also served by the Community Focus newspaper. Community Focus is an independent, monthly newspaper that concentrates on local events and information.

The city is also served by Pleasant Hill Patch, a local news website covering community news and events. Patch Media is owned by AOL Inc.

Sister Cities 

Pleasant Hill, California has one sister cities, as designated by Sister Cities International:
  Chilpancingo, Mexico

Notable people 

 Tom Hanks: Academy Award and Golden Globe winning actor who grew up and spent his early childhood in Pleasant Hill, CA (IMSA)
 Mike Guasch: professional race car driver (IMSA)
 Leslie Smith: professional mixed martial artist
 Tim Scully: underground LSD chemist
 Bob Roll: Professional Cyclist, TV Personality, Cyclist Commentator, Writer
 Bob Wilson: singer, songwriter, guitarist and Era label recording artist
 Ron Wotus: Bench Coach for the San Francisco Giants (coach who is second-in-command to the manager). Ron resides with his wife Laurie in Pleasant Hill, California.
 Julie Strain: Model and actress in over 100 movies; attended Diablo Valley College

References

External links 

 
 PHBA (Pleasant Hill Baseball Association)
 Pleasant Hill Chamber of Commerce website
 Pleasant Hill Interactive Community Guide
 Pleasant Hill Recreation & Park District website
 Profile of City & History
 Virtual Tour of Transit Village Construction Site
 

 
Cities in Contra Costa County, California
Cities in the San Francisco Bay Area
Incorporated cities and towns in California
Populated places established in 1961
1961 establishments in California